is a Japanese light novel series, written by Shoji Gatoh and illustrated by Range Murata. Shogakukan have published six volumes since November 2009 under their Gagaga Bunko imprint. An anime television series adaptation by Millepensee aired from July 8 to September 30, 2019.

Plot
Fifteen years ago, a mysterious hyperspace gate appeared over the Pacific Ocean in our world. Elves, fairies, and other fantastic creatures came through the gate from the other side and established diplomatic relations with Earth. In the present day, Kariana Island and its main city of San-Teresa serves as Earth's "front door" to the magical world on the other side of the gate, and over two million non-humans live within the city, mixing with additional human residents. This results in both prosperous growth for the island, and a seedy underbelly of criminals who seek to take advantage of it. The San-Teresa Metropolitan Police Department is established to keep order within the city between those two forces.

After a drug bust goes horribly wrong, Detective Sergeant Kei Matoba loses both the fairy being sold as a catalyst for new drugs and his partner of four years in the Metropolitan Police to a Semanian attacker. Despite his attitude towards the Semanian people he derisively calls "aliens", Matoba is forced to partner with a Semanian knight to find the fairy lost in the drug bust, as they consider the fairy an important Semanian citizen. From there, Matoba slowly learns to tolerate the Semanian people, while the knight slowly acclimates herself to Earth and its customs.

Main characters

A former JSDF soldier turned Detective Sergeant for the San-Teresa Metropolitan Police. He has a hostile attitude towards non-human "aliens" from the world beyond the gate, but slowly softens his attitude while working with Tilarna. Kei is willing to bend the rules or associate with unscrupulous people in order to accomplish his tasks. 

A noble Knight of Mirvor with a long name who has come through the gate to rescue the kidnapped fairy and punish those responsible for kidnapping her. She wields a sword and can use some magic but is unaccustomed to Earth and its modern technology.

Deputy coroner with the San-Teresa MPD. Kei's ex-girlfriend who still holds some feelings for him.

A corrupt chief of the San-Teresa Metropolitan Police Department Special Public Morals Division. He later reveals himself to be secretly assisting Zelada to spark a war between the humans and the Semanian people, fearing that the Earth's human population will be overrun by people from the other world in a peaceful time.

A black market dealer who runs the strip club "Lady Chapel" while putting up a thin guise of acting like a priest. Kei tolerates him as a confidential informant.

A bouncer and bodyguard who works for Biz O'Neill.

A powerful mage who can control dead bodies overdosed on fairy dust like puppets. Later revealed to be the evil mage responsible for wiping out most of Kei's unit during a battle years ago.

Media

Light novels
The first light novel volume was published on November 18, 2009 by Shogakukan under their Gagaga Bunko imprint. Six volumes have been published as of October 2016.

Anime
An anime television series adaptation was announced on December 29, 2018. The series aired from July 8 to September 30, 2019 on Tokyo MX, BS11, and Wowow.  The series is directed by Shin Itagaki and animated by Millepensee, with Shoji Gatoh himself penning the series' scripts, Hiromi Kimura designing the characters for animation and Taku Iwasaki composing the music.  Masayoshi Ōishi performed the series' opening theme song "Rakuen Toshi", while Mayu Yoshioka performed the series' ending theme song "Connected". Funimation has licensed the series outside Asia for a simuldub. In Southeast Asia, Muse Communication holds the rights to the series.

References

External links
 

2019 anime television series debuts
2009 Japanese novels
Anime and manga based on light novels
Gagaga Bunko
Light novels
Funimation
Muse Communication
Tokyo MX original programming